The Estadio Municipal de Villanueva del Fresno, is a football stadium in Villanueva del Fresno, Extremadura, Spain. It is currently used mostly for football matches and was the home ground of Sporting Villanueva Promesas. The stadium holds 3,000.

External links
Estadios de España 

Multi-purpose stadiums in Spain
Football venues in Extremadura
Buildings and structures in the Province of Badajoz